The New Jersey State Open Championship is the New Jersey state open golf tournament, open to both amateur and professional golfers. It is organized by the New Jersey State Golf Association. It has been played annually since 1921 at a variety of courses around the state. It was considered a PGA Tour event in the 1920s and 1930s.

Winners

2022 Louis Kelly
2021 Tyler Hall
2020 Mark Costanza (a) 
2019 Chris Gotterup (a)
2018 Marc Issler
2017 Luke Graboyes (a)
2016 Tyler Hall
2015 Tyler Hall
2014 Max Greyserman (a)
2013 Frank Esposito, Jr.
2012 Benjamin Smith (a)
2011 Kevin Foley
2010 Brian Gaffney
2009 Brett Jones
2008 Mark McCormick
2007 Brian Komline (a)
2006 Jason Lamp
2005 Brian Komline (a)
2004 Ed Whitman
2003 Greg Farrow
2002 Baker Maddera
2001 Chris Dachisen
2000 John DiMarco
1999 Frank Esposito, Jr.
1998 Kenneth Macdonald (a)
1997 Chris Dachisen
1996 Ed Whitman
1995 Ed Whitman
1994 Greg Hamilton
1993 Greg Hamilton
1992 Charlie Cowell
1991 Ed Whitman
1990 David Glenz
1989 Steve Sieg
1988 David Glenz
1987 Jamie Howell
1986 David Glenz
1985 Gary Ostrega
1984 David Glenz
1983 Jack Kiefer
1982 Russell Helwig
1981 Bob Issler
1980 Russell Helwig
1979 Art Silvestrone, Jr.
1978 Tom Ulozas
1977 Mike Stubblefield
1976 Jack Kiefer
1975 Jack Kiefer
1974 John Buczek
1973 Art Silvestrone, Sr.
1972 Art Silvestrone, Sr.
1971 Babe Lichardus
1970 Billy Ziobro (a)
1969 Babe Lichardus
1968 Ron Howell
1967 Pat Schwab
1966 Mike Burke Sr.
1965 Babe Lichardus
1964 Lester Ward
1963 Wes Ellis
1962 Wes Ellis
1961 Billy Farrell
1960 Al Mengert
1959 Lou Barbaro
1958 Al Mengert
1957 Al Mengert
1956 Chester Sanok (a)
1955 Stan Mosel
1954 David Baldwin (a)
1953 Lou Barbaro
1952 Babe Lichardus
1951 Chester Sanok (a)
1950 Emery Thomas
1949 Emery Thomas
1948 Jack Mitchell
1947 Gene Kunes
1946 Jack Mitchell
1945 Frank Kringle
1944 Vic Ghezzi
1943 Vic Ghezzi
1942 Charles Whitehead
1941 Jack Mitchell
1940 Johnny Kinder
1939 Jim Barnes
1938 Ted Turner
1937 Vic Ghezzi
1936 Johnny Farrell
1935 Byron Nelson
1934 Craig Wood
1933 Clarence Clark
1932 Johnny Kinder
1931 Johnny Kinder
1930 Paul Runyan
1929 Johnny Golden
1928 Johnny Golden
1927 Johnny Golden
1926 Clarence Hackney
1925 Clarence Hackney
1924 Clarence Hackney
1923 Dave Campbell
1922 Martin J. O'Loughlin
1921 Peter O'Hara

(a) denotes amateur

External links
New Jersey State Golf Association
List of winners

Former PGA Tour events
Golf in New Jersey
State Open golf tournaments